The Chevrolet Turbo Titan III was a gas turbine-powered concept cabover heavy truck designed and built as a working prototype by General Motors in 1965. It was accompanied by a matching custom trailer built in stainless steel; the Turbo Titan III was first shown to the public at the 1965 session of the 1964 New York World's Fair.

History
GM designed and built prototype trucks in the 1950s using the same gas turbine engines as the ones used in its Firebird concept sports cars, including the Turbo Titan I (GT-304 turbine, also fitted to Firebird II) and II (GT-305, Firebird III).

Rival Ford had built a similar turbine-powered Big Red concept truck, first shown at the 1964 New York World's Fair. The dual-turbine GM Bison was also exhibited at the 1964 World's Fair; under most operating conditions, the Bison would drive on its GT-309 turbine engine, using the auxiliary  turbine as needed for loads, grades, or acceleration.

Reportedly, the Turbo Titan III prototype was destroyed in the late 1960s.

Design
The Turbo Titan III was built around the General Motors GT-309 gas turbine engine and featured streamlined Space Age-styling.

Styling
The cab was built using fiberglass and steel, with prominent air intakes for the GT-309 engine on either side of the front fascia. At the time, the head of design for General Motors was Bill Mitchell. The chassis was a conventional Chevrolet tilt-cab cab-over-engine, first marketed in 1960. Both the headlight units and front turn signals retracted into the body when not in use. The interior featured aircraft-like gauges and a "twin dial" steering unit.

GT-309 gas turbine
The GT-309 was derived from earlier GM gas turbine engines developed for the Firebird concept cars of the 1950s. For the GT-309, the turbine and compressor were designed to operate at 35,700 RPM, with reduction gearing used for the upper output shaft, generating  at a shaft speed of 4,000 RPM. The GT-309 has a free-turbine turboshaft design in which the output shaft is not mechanically coupled to the compressor shaft, but to maintain a nearly-constant operating temperature and provide for engine braking, the engine was fitted with a variable clutch that coupled the gasifier (compressor turbine rotor) with the output shaft; this system was developed jointly with Allison Transmission and branded "Power Transfer". Compared to a diesel engine of similar output, the GT-309 was more compact and was only  of the weight.

The GT-309 was also fitted to GM New Look bus prototypes, as the Turbo-Cruiser II and III, and other bus prototypes including the RTX and later RTS-3T that competed in the Transbus Program.

See also
Ford Big Red

References

External links
 

Cars introduced in 1965
Chevrolet concept vehicles
Gas turbine vehicles
Space Age
1964 New York World's Fair